The 1906 Australian federal election was held in Australia on 12 December 1906. All 75 seats in the House of Representatives, and 18 of the 36 seats in the Senate were up for election. The incumbent Protectionist Party minority government led by Prime Minister Alfred Deakin retained government, despite winning the fewest House of Representatives votes and seats of the three parties. Parliamentary support was provided by the Labour Party led by Chris Watson, while the Anti-Socialist Party (renamed from the Free Trade Party), led by George Reid, remained in opposition.

Watson resigned as Labour leader in October 1907 and was replaced by Andrew Fisher. The Protectionist minority government fell in November 1908 to Labour, and a few days later Reid resigned as Anti-Socialist leader, being replaced by Joseph Cook. The Labour minority government fell in June 1909 to the newly formed Commonwealth Liberal Party led by Deakin; this Party was formed on a shared anti-Labour platform as a merger organised between Deakin, the leader of the Protectionists, and Cook, the leader of the Anti-Socialists, to counter Labour's growing popularity. The merger did not sit well with several of the more progressive Protectionists, who defected to Labour or sat as independents.

The merger would allow the Deakin Commonwealth Liberals to construct a mid-term parliamentary majority, however less than a year later, at the 1910 election, Labour won both majority government and a Senate majority, representing a number of firsts: it was Australia's first elected federal majority government, Australia's first elected Senate majority, the world's first Labour Party majority government at a national level, and after the 1904 Watson minority government, the world's second Labour Party government at a national level.

Results

House of Representatives

Senate

Significance
It was the third federal election in Australia following the adoption of the federal government. The election was largely important as it would demonstrate which of the parties (if any) could hold together a stable government after the unstable second term of the previous one, which saw four different governments in power. It would also see if all parties could survive the implementation of protectionist policies which differentiated the two. This was also the first election where all seats for the House of Representatives were voted for via a First-past-the-post system (at previous elections some states voted as one electorate, using a bloc vote), and the first time that Tasmania was divided into separate electorates. The election result was the continuation of a Protectionist government led by Deakin and supported by Labour, which remained in power largely due to the unwillingness of the Anti-Socialist Party to support a vote of no confidence against it.

George Reid adopted a strategy of trying to reorient the party system along Labour vs non-Labour lines – before the election, he renamed his Free Trade Party to the Anti-Socialist Party. Reid envisaged a spectrum running from socialist to anti-socialist, with the Protectionist Party in the middle. This attempt struck a chord with politicians who were steeped in the Westminster tradition and regarded a two-party system as very much the norm.

Since the Protectionist primary platform of government tariffs had been dealt with by previous governments, the party had become somewhat redundant. Those who remained were largely supporting the Party's leader, Alfred Deakin, rather than its policies. Of the three, the Labour Party, led by Chris Watson, now had the most realistic chance of becoming the dominant party after their gains in the 1903 election and after their leading status in the four minor states they were looking to make the same type of gains in Victoria and New South Wales.

The first federal referendum in Australia's history was held in conjunction with the election.  The proposed alteration to the Constitution, to change the start date of Senators' terms from 1 January to 1 July, passed in all states and was carried.

Seats changing hands

 Members listed in italics did not contest their seat at this election.

Post-election pendulum

See also
 Candidates of the Australian federal election, 1906
 Members of the Australian House of Representatives, 1906–1910
 Members of the Australian Senate, 1907–1910

Notes

References

Federal elections in Australia
1906 elections in Australia
December 1906 events